The 29th Canadian Parliament was in session from January 4, 1973, until May 9, 1974. The membership was set by the 1972 federal election on October 30, 1972, and it was dissolved prior to the 1974 election. It was controlled by a Liberal Party minority led by Prime Minister Pierre Trudeau and the 20th Canadian Ministry, with the support of David Lewis's New Democratic Party.  The Official Opposition was the Progressive Conservative Party, led by Robert Stanfield. The Speaker was Lucien Lamoureux.

The government lost the confidence of the house in 1974 when finance minister John Turner's budget was defeated by a vote of 137 to 123, prompting the prime minister to seek dissolution of parliament for the next election.

There were two sessions of the 29th Parliament. The first was from January 4, 1973, to February 26, 1974, and the second was from February 27 to May 9, 1974.

Members of the House of Commons
Members of the House of Commons in the 29th parliament arranged by province.

Newfoundland

Prince Edward Island

Nova Scotia

New Brunswick

Quebec

* Roch La Salle rejoined the Progressive Conservative on February 26, 1974

Ontario

Manitoba

Saskatchewan

Alberta

British Columbia

Northern Territories

By-elections
No by-elections were called during the 29th Parliament. Two seats remained vacant when the 1974 federal election was called.

See also
 List of Canadian electoral districts (1966–1976)

References

 

 
Canadian parliaments
1973 establishments in Canada
1974 disestablishments in Canada
1973 in Canada
1974 in Canada